The European White Elm cultivar Ulmus laevis 'Aureovariegata' (also 'Aureo-variegata'), a yellow-variegated form, may have been the tree first listed, without description, in Hortus Regius Monacensis (1829) as Ulmus effusa (: laevis) variegata, grown at the Munich Botanic Garden. An Ulmus effusa (: laevis) fol. variegatis (Hort.) was first described c.1890 by the Späth nursery of Berlin, which distributed the tree in the late 19th century. The name U. effusa (: laevis) f. aureovariegata appeared in Beissner and Schelle's Handbuch der Laubholz-Benennung, 1903, without description.

There was also an Ulmus laevis cultivar 'Punctata', with white-flecked leaves.

Description
Henry (1913) briefly described Aureo-variegata as having "leaves spotted with yellow". The leaves of Späth's U. effusa fol. variegatis (Hort.) (1890) were "colourfully marbled and streaked".

Cultivation
No specimens are known to survive. The cultivar, present in Späth's late 19th-century catalogues, is absent from his early 20th, perhaps suggesting that the leaves were prone to revert to green.

References

External links
 Herbarium specimen of variegated U. laevis, labelled U. effusa  Willd. foliis argent.-varieg. ('Argenteo-Variegata'), science.udau.edu.ua

European white elm cultivar
Ulmus articles missing images
Ulmus

pl:Wiąz szypułkowy 'Aureovariegata'